Columbia Workshop was a radio series that aired on the Columbia Broadcasting System from 1936 to 1943, returning in 1946–47.

Irving Reis
The series began as the idea of Irving Reis. Reis had begun his radio career as an engineer and developed a fascination with the possibilities of the relatively new medium. His idea was to use experimental modes of narrative to enhance the way a narrative was conveyed over the radio. Reis had isolated attempts to experiment on the radio:  Before the Columbia Workshop'''s debut, he had directed at least a few radio dramas. For Reis, the Columbia Workshop was a platform for developing new techniques for presentation on radio as noted in the debut broadcast:
The Columbia Workshop dedicates itself to the purposes of familiarizing you with the story behind radio, both in broadcasting, as well as in aviation, shipping, communication and pathology, and to experiment in new techniques with a hope of discovering or evolving new and better forms of radio presentation, with especial emphasis on radio drama; to encourage and present the work of new writers and artists who may have fresh and vital ideas to contribute.

As a sustaining program, the Workshop served as a symbol to prove to the public (and the Federal Communications Commission) that CBS was concerned with educating and serving the public.

Early shows on the Workshop exemplified Reis's penchant for experimentation through narrative and technical means. The second program, Broadway Evening followed a couple as they meandered down Broadway during an evening. A subsequent show had at least 30 characters functioning within a half-hour drama. Among the technical demonstrations were sound effects, the use of various kinds of microphones to achieve various aural effects and voice impersonators (including sound effects produced by voice).

Reis called upon others to try their hand in writing new or adapting existing material for the experimental nature of the Workshop. Orson Welles did a two-part adaptation of Shakespeare's Hamlet (mentioned along with the Workshop in the fictitious film Me and Orson Welles), as well as a 30-minute condensation of Macbeth. Irwin Shaw contributed one show, and Stephen Vincent Benét adapted several of his short stories. Reis also experimented with readings and dramatizations of poetry, including works by Samuel Taylor Coleridge, John Masefield and Edgar Allan Poe. One of the most notable presentations of Reis's tenure was Archibald MacLeish's original radio play, The Fall of the City. With a cast that included Burgess Meredith, Orson Welles and 300 students, the play was notable for its portrayal of the collapse of a city under an unnamed dictator, a commentary on fascism in Germany and Italy.

Reis recognized music as an important part of radio presentation. As part of CBS's commissioning of five classical composers to write original works for radio, Deems Taylor narrated a concert (November 7, 1936) which demonstrated the possibilities of idiomatic music composition for radio by playing orchestrations of three works by staff arranger Amadeo de Fillipi.

Among the most significant musical contributions Reis made was appointing Bernard Herrmann music director of the Workshop. Herrmann had previously worked on CBS primarily as a conductor. He had composed his first radio drama for the Workshop, but it was only after his second program, Rhythm of the Jute Mill (broadcast December 12, 1936) that the appointment was made. Thereafter Herrmann composed many radio shows himself, also conducting the music of others and even proposing a show entirely devoted to music composed for the Workshop.

Other significant musical contributions during Reis's directorship include Paul Sterrett's and Leith Stevens's score for a two-part presentation of Alice in Wonderland in which music took the place of all sound effects, and Marc Blitzstein's half-hour musical I've Got the Tune, which similarly tried to convey sound effects and long-distance travel through purely musical means.

William N. Robson

On the broadcast of December 23, 1937 (the first of a two-part dramatization of Lewis Carroll's Alice Through the Looking-Glass), it was announced that William N. Robson had succeeded Irving Reis as director of the Columbia Workshop. Reis moved to Hollywood and continued his career in the film industry. Though the Workshop continued some experimentation, Robson placed greater emphasis on good dramatic adaptations, rather than didactic explanations of radio techniques.

Robson was not averse to experimentation. His San Quentin Prison Break, originally broadcast prior to the Workshop on January 16, 1935 was based on an actual incident. To achieve a sense of realism, the dramatization was a combination news report or documentary. Unlike most radio dramas, there was no narrator involved. This was later rebroadcast as part of the Workshop on September 10, 1936.

Under Robson's aegis, the Workshop was able to broadcast a number of notable shows. Known more as a film director, Pare Lorentz wrote and directed Ecce Homo, a story concerning the relationship of man and technology. Both Irwin Shaw and Archibald MacLeish were invited back to write and direct shows as they had done under Reis's leadership. The Workshop extended its experimental mode by preceding the new MacLeish play, Air Raid with a broadcast of its rehearsal. Stephen Vincent Benèt continued to write for the Workshop, and author Wilbur Daniel Steele made his own adaptations of his previously written short stories. Arch Oboler, known for Lights Out! series, contributed one script, as did Thornton Wilder and budding writer Arthur Laurents.

At times, Robson reached beyond the typical crop of radio authors, selecting at least one script (Anita Fairgrieve's Andrea del Sarto), from his class in radio writing at New York University as well as soliciting scripts on the air from the listening audience.

With Bernard Herrmann continuing as music director, Robson (probably at Herrmann's insistence) included a few extended musical works and opera on the Workshop. Frederick Delius's Hassan, and two operas by Vittorio Giannini, Beauty and the Beast and Blennerhasset, were among those heard. Robson apparently stepped down sometime in mid-1939, after which the Workshop was somewhat adrift. Brewster Morgan and Earle McGill are credited as being those responsible for continuing the series.

Norman Corwin

Norman Corwin had been a rising star at CBS for a few years, and had even some of his work aired on the Workshop as early as 1938, when his adaptation of Stephen Crane's The Red Badge of Courage aired.  But his sense of social justice again changed the direction of the Workshop into one frequently addressing current issues. By the fall 1940, Corwin was leading the Workshop, and in 1941, the series was giving the subtitle 26 by Corwin, attesting to the author's seemingly indefatigable energy. Given Corwin's strong interest in issues of the day, it is ironic he left the Workshop just one month prior to the bombing of Pearl Harbor.

Final years

It is not entirely clear who led the Columbia Workshop during 1942, but interest in the program was clearly waning. There were a few significant programs (historically the most interesting of them is probably the airing of John Cage's and Kenneth Patchen's The City Wears a Slouch Hat).  There are only a few references to shows in 1943. The show had a revival in the 1946–47 season.  When it was revived in 1956, it was retitled the CBS Radio Workshop.

 Radio techniques 
The Columbia Workshop gave authors, directors, sound engineers and composers many opportunities to experiment with the use of sound as a device for enhancing narrative.

 Sound filters Buck Rogers was broadcast from a 21st-floor studio that had been troubled with air conditioning noises. At a bend in a duct the air gave a whoosh that had been difficult to dampen. Later, when it became necessary to suggest a rocket traveling through outer space, someone remembered the duct and put a microphone in the bend. Whenever Buck Rogers was on the move, the microphone was opened, producing the sound of a spaceship. This was the first development in sound filters.
 
Filters developed upon the need for radio directors to find a way to portray a voice over the telephone. The filters were generally small boxes through which a microphone circuit could be shunted. The box had dials on its surface. Its inner mechanism could remove upper or lower tones or a combination of them to give an incomplete reproduction, as given by a telephone. The dials allowed the engineer to vary the effect, creating varieties of incompleteness. It became common for radio personnel to play around with the filters to find new sounds, and then having radio shows based upon their discoveries.

 Staff 
Many of the staff who worked on the Columbia Workshop would continue with CBS and work for television.
Bernard Herrmann, composer
Earle McGill, writer, director
Irving Reis, writer, director
William N. Robson, writer, director
Leith Stevens, composer
Guy Della-Cioppa, writer

Award
The Columbia Workshop received a 1946 Peabody Award for Outstanding Entertainment in Drama.

List of Columbia Workshop programs
This is a list of all the Columbia Workshop'' programs, giving known information about authors, adaptors, directors/producers, composers.  Occasional remarks have been included.  Gaps in dates usually refer to programs that were pre-empted.  Information for the years 1942–43 is difficult to come by.

Sources

References

Listen to

Columbia Workshop: "Meridian 7-1212" (rebroadcast of August 24, 1939)

External links
The Definitive: Columbia Workshop
Jerry Haendiges Vintage Radio Logs: Columbia Workshop

American radio dramas
1930s American radio programs
1940s American radio programs
1950s American radio programs
CBS Radio programs
Peabody Award-winning radio programs
1936 radio programme debuts
1943 radio programme endings
1946 radio programme debuts
1947 radio programme endings